Hamid Amni (Persian: حمید امنی, born May 21, 1990, in Tehran, Iran) is a Kickboxer who competed for Iran Kickboxing National Team. Hamid Amni is currently competing and studying in the United States.

Biography 
Hamid Amni got his Bachelor's degree in Physical education and Sports sciences at Kharazmi University. After his Bachelor's degree, he continued his Master's degree at Kharazmi University. In the same year, he became a member of the Iran Kickboxing National Team and won his first International medal, a silver medal at WAKO Asian Kickboxing Championship 2015 Pune-India. After competing for several years in Iran Kickboxing National Team and winning International medals for Iran Kickboxing National team, he started his PhD program in Physical education at the University of North Carolina at Greensboro, United States. He also lived for two years in Istanbul, Turkey, before coming to the US.

Achievements

Persian and English articles/books 

 Co-translator of the book “Fitness Steps to Success ” by Nancy L. Naternicola (2016).
 Martial Arts athlete's salaries, first part.
 Martial Arts athlete's salaries, second part.
 Effects of exercise intensity on soleus muscle myostatin and follistatin levels ofhyperglycaemic rats.

References 

1990 births
Living people
Sportspeople from Tehran
Iranian male kickboxers